North Lindsey Township is a township in Benton County, in the U.S. state of Missouri.

North Lindsey Township takes its name from Judge John W. Lindsay, who sat on the County Court bench.

References

Townships in Missouri
Townships in Benton County, Missouri